Munawar Shakeel (Punjabi and ) famous Punjabi Poet Born in a village near Rurala Road 25 km from Jaranwala city District Faisalabad, Punjab, Pakistan in 1969.He by profession a road side Cobbler and writer of Five Punjabi language award-winning books. while repairing shoes he used to write poetry . Headmaster of 282 GB Bashir Hamid was his mentor.

Books
First book Soch Samandar (Punjabi سوچ سمندر ) was published in 2004.
Second book Pardes Di Sangat (Punjabi سنگت پردیس دی   ) was published in 2005
Third book Saddiyan De Bhait ( صدیاں دے بھیت) in 2009
Fourth book Jhora Dhap Gawachi Da (چھورا دھپ گوچی دا) in 2011
Fifth Akhaan Mitti Ho Gaiyaan ankhaian (مٹی ہو گئیاں اکھیاں) was published in 2013.

Awards
He has received awards from organisations such as Ashna-e-Saandal Bar,Pakistan Writers Guild, and Punjabi Sevak.
Munawar is a member of literary groups like the Royal Adabi Academy, Jaranwala and the Naqeebi Karvan-e-Adab

References

20th-century Pakistani poets
21st-century Pakistani poets
Punjabi-language poets
1969 births
Living people